Friday Harbor may refer to:

 Friday Harbor, Washington
 Friday Harbor Laboratories, a marine biology field station of the University of Washington
 Friday Harbor (series), a series of romance novels by Lisa Kleypas